Pokémon Puzzle Challenge is a video game for the Game Boy Color. It is based on Panel de Pon, only with characters from the Pokémon franchise. The characters in Pokémon Puzzle Challenge are based on those in the Gold and Silver games, while those in Pokémon Puzzle League—its Nintendo 64 equivalent—were based more on the anime characters. However, the game is also focused around beating the Johto leaders in a puzzle challenge in Johto region. The game play mode is divided into 1 Player, 2 Player, and Training. The game was later released on the Nintendo eShop on November 6, 2014.

Gameplay

Pokémon Puzzle Challenge features Pokémon characters in a version of Panel de Pon. Panel de Pon featured unique characters for both player-characters and opponents; similarly, Pokémon such as Pikachu, Pichu, Cyndaquil, Totodile, and Chikorita appear as playable heroes, while Gym Leaders, trainers, and the Elite Four from Pokémon Gold and Silver appear as opponents, all of them utilizing a single Pokémon used in Gold and Silver. It features the ability to collect Pokémon by battling certain trainers in order to unlock new and permanent Pokémon to play as; if one manages to achieve a certain prerequisite. Similarly, the music in the game was redone from the original Gold and Silver with new upbeat, yet familiar songs to complement the gameplay style. Players attempt to meet a goal, achieve a high score, or outlast opponents by preventing blocks from reaching the top of the player's playfield. The game has three modes of play — single player, multi player, and training modes. There are also several other sub-modes: Marathon, Challenge, Time Zone, LineClear, Puzzle, and Garbage!.

Marathon involves playing infinitely until players lose; Challenge is a versus computer or another player, involving forming combos to force the opposition to lose, though unlike other versions of the game, only the player's puzzle is visible, the opponent's replaced with a block meter (HP meter in 1P Challenge) indicating how close they are to losing; Time Zone involves forming a high enough score in a certain amount of time; LineClear involves clearing levels by reaching a certain number of lines; Puzzle involves clearing a select number of blocks in a certain number of turns; and Garbage! is similarly to Marathon in being infinite, except garbage blocks fall on players' field, making it more difficult. With the exception of Puzzle, reaching the top in any of these modes results in the mode ending. The gameplay is largely the same as in other games in the Puzzle League series; players control a two square long cursor that can swap or move blocks around the field. The objective is to clear blocks in at least three block clears or more, while players are encouraged to combo and/or chain. Combos are performed by clearing more than three blocks, and chains are performed when falling blocks from one clear cause another set of blocks to clear. In certain modes, combo and/or chain clears will cause objects called garbage blocks to fall on enemies' areas with intent of forcing them to reach the top, thereby ending the round in players' favour. Unlike its counterparts on other platforms, it uses a 6x9 puzzle grid which is smaller in size.

Similarly, Tetris Attack and Kirby's Star Stacker for the Game Boy use the same size puzzle grid.

Development
Pokémon Puzzle Challenge was first announced in Nintendo employee Peter Main's "Industry Review" webcast under the title Pokémon Attack on January 13, 2000. It was developed by Intelligent Systems and published by Nintendo. Its name was eventually changed to Pokémon Puzzle League, similar to the Nintendo 64 video game. It was eventually released as Pokémon Puzzle Challenge. The delay was explained as being due to the release of Pokémon Gold and Silver, believing them to be enough to appease fans. A screensaver was released by Nintendo to promote the game. It was released in Japan on September 21, 2000, December 4, 2000 in North America, and June 15, 2001 in PAL regions.

Reception

Pre-release reception
When it was first announced, few details were revealed. Upon hearing about it, IGN theorized that it was an Americanized version of Puyo Puyo Sun with Pokémon characters, similar to how Kirby's Avalanche was a localization of Puyo Puyo. In a preview, IGN praised Pokémon Puzzle Challenge for its gameplay, calling them "nice and simple to appeal to players of all ages and levels". In another preview, they comment that this idea was a great one to get kids to "stare at even more Pokemon images for even more hours on end".

Critical reception

Since its release, Pokémon Puzzle Challenge has received highly positive reception. It holds an aggregate score of 90.20% at GameRankings, making it the 10th best Game Boy Color game and the 300th best video game on Game Rankings. Nintendo Power gave it a perfect score, while Electronic Gaming Monthly gave it a nine out of 10. Nintendo Power nominated it for "best puzzle game" and "best Pokémon game". ultimately losing to Pokémon Puzzle League for the former category and Pokémon Gold and Silver for the latter. Nintendo Power also listed Pokémon Puzzle Challenge as the 13th best Game Boy/Game Boy Color video game, calling the gameplay only second in addictiveness to Tetris, ultimately giving the nod to this version of the gameplay over Tetris Attack because of a few extra features. Game Informers Ben Reeves called it the 12th best Game Boy game. He noted that it beat out Tetris Attack for this game's increased polish. Children's software & new media revue: Volume 9 called it "addictive", commenting that those who were not interested in the series would be fine, commenting that it "holds little similarity" to the Pokémon franchise. IGN editor Craig Harris called the return of the Tetris Attack gameplay "welcome", commenting that it was "as fun and addictive as it ever was". However, he criticized its lack of a Puzzle Edit mode, a mode found in the Nintendo 64 counterpart game Pokémon Puzzle League. He awarded it the Editor's Choice award. In a Pokémon video game retrospective, fellow IGN editor Lucas M. Thomas commented that while it didn't bring anything new to the Tetris Attack gameplay, it being in a "new, Colorized portable version was enough". GameSpot editor Frank Provo commented that it "does the Pokémon license proud", calling it both "addictive" and praising its overall value. GamePro gave it 4.5 stars out of five, awarding it their Editor's Choice award. William Schiffmann of The Associated Press commented that while it doesn't "break any new ground" and the Pokémon theme constitutes a "sales gimmick", fans of Tetris would enjoy it.

Notes

References

External links 

 Official Nintendo Japan website 

2000 video games
Game Boy Color games
Intelligent Systems games
Puzzle League
Video games developed in Japan
Virtual Console games
Virtual Console games for Nintendo 3DS